Night Ride was a long-running BBC Radio 2 overnight radio programme. It first went on air in 1967 and was revived as part of a schedule overhaul in January 1984 when it was heard daily from 1am to 3am. In January 1991 it was extended to start at 12.35am and eventually it became a three-hour programme, beginning at 12.05am.

Many different presenters hosted the programme over the years with two presenters at any one time - one during the week and the other hosting the programme Friday to Sunday nights. Each presented the programme for a couple of months. One of the longest standing hosts of the programme was Bill Rennells who presented the programme on an ad-hoc basis for almost a decade.

References

BBC Radio 2 programmes